The A43 is a primary route in the English Midlands and northern South East England, that runs from the M40 motorway near Ardley in Oxfordshire to Stamford in Lincolnshire. Through Northamptonshire it bypasses the towns of Northampton, Kettering and Corby which are the three principal destinations on the A43 route. The A43 also links to the M1 motorway.

The section of the road between the M40 and M1 is designated a trunk road, managed and maintained by National Highways.  The remainder of the route is the responsibility of local authorities.

Route of road

M40 to M1
The A43 starts at M40 junction 10 (the location of Cherwell Valley Services) which is widely regarded as being one of the worst motorway junctions in the country despite improvements made in the early 2000s. There are often long tailbacks at the junction, even at off-peak times.

Following the junction with the M40, the A43 first meets a roundabout with the B4100 for traffic headed north-west for the village of Aynho or south for the town of Bicester. Continuing north, the A43 passes many Oxfordshire and Northamptonshire rural villages and towns before meeting the A421 which spurs towards Buckingham and later, Milton Keynes.

The stretch of A43 through south Northamptonshire was upgraded to dual carriageway standard between the M1 and Towcester in 1991 and through to the M40 in the early 2000s. This was primarily to provide a link from the M1 to the M40 and also to Silverstone, home of the British Grand Prix. During the Grand Prix the A43 is closed to through traffic between Brackley and Towcester.

The town of Brackley was bypassed in 1987. Just south of Brackley, drivers will approach a traffic island which spurs off in one direction for the A422 (for the M40 at Banbury and the A423 for motorists heading for Warwickshire) or the other direction which continues as the A43 into Northamptonshire. The A422 is met once again to the east of Brackley, allowing motorists an additional route into Buckinghamshire. Two miles north of Brackley, the B4525 (a B classified route for traffic from South Northamptonshire to reach the M40 at Banbury) joins the A43.

From here, the A43 leaves the Oxfordshire borders and continues in a north-easterly direction towards Silverstone, where the road joins the A413 at a grade-separated junction.

Later, the A43 bypasses Towcester, where it meets the A5 (Roman Watling Street) at a roundabout created when the road was built from Towcester in 1991. This roundabout was dangerously unsuited to the traffic volumes but was upgraded with traffic light controls during the first half of 2015. A flyover may need to be installed when the expansion of Towcester begins in 2018–2022. Continuing towards Northampton, it by-passes Blisworth and Milton Malsor villages, before reaching the M1 at junction 15A, at Rothersthorpe services. This stretch has four dangerous crossover junctions - one from Towcester via Old Towcester Road, two from Tiffield and one from Blisworth, unlike the rest of the route from the M40 where the junctions are either fully graded, as at Silverstone, or have roundabouts.

M1 to Corby
From M1 junction 15a the A43 runs concurrently southbound on the M1 to junction 15.  It then follows the A45 Nene Valley Way up to the Lumbertubs Way Interchange.  From here it splits from the A45 and continues via dual carriageway where it meets the Round Spinney roundabout. North of Northampton, it rejoins the old course of the A43 and passes through Moulton. A new 1.6 km dual carriageway bypass is currently being constructed which will link the Round Spinney roundabout with the existing road just north of the Moulton roundabout, which is due for completion in Spring 2018.

Following this, the road has a straight, rural stretch before reaching a roundabout at Broughton. After bypassing Broughton, it continues towards Kettering. It overlaps the A14 at its Junction 8, to bypass Kettering. At Junction 7 the A43 re-emerges on a new dual carriageway bypass. The old route of the A43 through Kettering town centre is still intact.

After bypassing Kettering, the road previously travelled through the historic village of Geddington. The old road is still regularly used, possibly due to poor signage or lack of SatNav updates. A new bypass, called the Corby Link Road, opened in 2014, from Barford Bridge on the A6003 to the A43 west of Stanion. Continuing from here, it passes the Euro-Hub site at Corby, and then it passes Corby and reaches several roundabouts.

Corby to Stamford
After bypassing Corby and Weldon, it heads out on a rural stretch, past Deene Park, and then bypassing Bulwick, the only village on this stretch. It passes some splendid woodland, and then heads towards Duddington.

Bypassing Duddington, it meets the A47. After  it passes through Collyweston and Easton-on-the-Hill.

Then it meets the A1, before continuing towards Stamford. Previously, the A43 stopped at a junction with the Old A1 (Great North Road) in Stamford, but now that Stamford is bypassed, the A43 continues over the River Welland, until it reaches the A1175.

History of the road number
The original (1923) route of the A43 was from the A42 (later the A34) at Kidlington to Stamford.  After completion of the Oxford Ring Road, the southern terminus was changed to the Pear Tree Roundabout between Kidlington and Oxford.  When the M40 was opened in 1991 the road from the Pear Tree Roundabout to Weston-on-the-Green was renumbered A34, and the stretch through Middleton Stoney between the A34 and junction 10 of the M40 was downgraded to the B430.

External links
Chris's British Roads Directory - Bad Junctions - M40/A43
SABRE Roads route description

References

Roads in England
Transport in Lincolnshire
Transport in Northamptonshire
Roads in Oxfordshire